"Who the Fuck Is That?" It was the first single from Dolla's unreleased debut album A Dolla and a Dream. The song features T-Pain and Tay Dizm. It reached number 65 on Billboard's Hot Digital Songs chart in March 2008. The official remix of the song features labelmates T-Pain, Akon and Klepto.

Music video
The song's music video leaked in November 2007. It premiered on BET's 106 & Park on January 14, 2008.

Charts

References

2007 debut singles
T-Pain songs
Songs written by T-Pain
2007 songs
Songs written by Akon
Jive Records singles
LaFace Records singles
Crunk songs